Thomas James Ridgewell (born 27 June 1990), known online as TomSka, is a British filmmaker, content creator, vlogger, comedian, and actor. He is known for writing, directing, producing, and starring in his live-action sketch comedy YouTube videos and animated web-series such as asdfmovie, Crash Zoom, and Eddsworld where he provided the voice of Tom and served as showrunner from 2012 to 2016. , his YouTube channel has over 7.13 million subscribers, and his videos have garnered over 1.9 billion views.

Early life and education 
Thomas James Ridgewell was born on 27 June 1990 in Essex, England.
He was raised as a Jehovah’s Witness. As a child, Ridgewell made short films using his parents' video camera. Shortly after YouTube was established, Ridgewell created CakeBomb, a website where he posted his projects, including his animated web series asdfmovie and his friend Edd Gould's Eddsworld. Ridgewell graduated from the University of Lincoln where he studied Media Production, and whilst studying created a series of unofficial advertisements for the university which received millions of views and were also featured on the BBC.

Career 
As a professional YouTuber, Ridgewell earns money from revenue from his videos on the website. He has been interviewed about this and has had this aspect of his life discussed, especially when the medium of online video was in its infancy. He has appeared as a guest on the BBC's The One Show and created short films for Comedy Central.

In October 2007, Ridgewell created a secondary channel called DarkSquidge (currently known as TomSka & Friends). , the channel has over 1.38 million subscribers and over 191 million views. While his main channel consists of sketch comedy and animations, The "TomSka & Friends" channel shows behind-the-scenes footage of TomSka-related projects and videos, as well as vlogging. Ridgewell also engages in social commentary, covering topics like mental health, sexual health, and body positivity. From April 2016 to February 2018, he uploaded weekly vlogs to the channel in a series named Last Week.

In 2008, Ridgewell released the first episode of asdfmovie, an animated sketch comedy series featuring short clips of minimalist characters in surreal and occasionally darkly humorous situations. The "asdf" part of the name originates from the first four characters of the second row of letters on the "QWERTY" keyboard layout. The song "Beep Beep I'm a Sheep" by Canadian musician LilDeuceDeuce with vocals by Ridgewell and Gabriel Brown, released alongside asdfmovie10, was featured in the dance rhythm game Just Dance 2018. A book based on the asdfmovie series, titled Art is Dead: the asdf book, was written by Ridgewell, illustrated by Matt Ley and published by Little Brown on 22 October 2015. A second book titled Sam Kills Christmas, written by Ridgewell and Eddie Bowley with illustrations by Dorina Herdewijn, was released on 8 November 2018.

In 2012, Ridgewell founded the media production company TurboPunch Ltd., located in London. He currently works there alongside co-writer Eddie Bowley and video editor Elliot Gough. Ridgewell also became the producer of Eddsworld after the show's creator, Edd Gould, died of leukaemia. He left the series in 2016, relinquishing the show to animator Matt Hargreaves.

In February 2013, Ridgewell was featured on the cover of Wired UK as part of a feature titled "How YouTube Reinvented the Entertainment Business". In May 2013, he was featured in YouTube's first Comedy Week as a guest host for its Geek Week series in August.

In 2014, Ridgewell, in collaboration with video game developer Pixel Spill Studios, created the game KatataK, a side-scrolling shoot 'em up for iOS and Android devices. In September 2014, the BBC announced Ridgewell would appear as a guest presenter on the Dan and Phil Show on BBC Radio 1.

In 2016, Ridgewell filmed several sketches with the BBC for a potential sketch show on BBC Three.

In May 2018, Ridgewell uploaded "The Muffin Song", a spin-off song of his asdfmovie series, in collaboration with Schmoyoho. , the video has garnered over 200 million views.

In 2019, Ridgewell developed a card game based on asdfmovie in collaboration with Big Potato Games called Muffin Time: The Random Card Game. He raised over £1,000,000 for the game on Kickstarter.

Personal life 
Ridgewell's twin sister died prenatally after their mother sustained injuries in a car accident.

He was raised a Jehovah's Witness but no longer practices this faith. Despite this, he has expressed belief in a higher power.

Though not primarily a musician by trade, Ridgewell has played bass guitar in multiple videos, including "Guitar Warfare" and "Mine Turtle" as a featured artist with LilDeuceDeuce.

He endorsed the Labour Party in the 2017 United Kingdom general election and expressed his opposition to both Brexit and the Conservative Party.

Books 
 Art Is Dead: the asdf book (2015, Little Brown Book Group)
 Sam Kills Christmas (2018, Little Brown Book Group)
  Zack Comic  (2010-2011, Unknown)
  Asfdbook  (2010, Unknown)

Notes

References 

1990 births
Alumni of the University of Lincoln
British Internet celebrities
British video bloggers
English male web series actors
English video bloggers
English YouTubers
Former Jehovah's Witnesses
Living people
Male bloggers
People from Essex
Surreal comedy
Black comedy
British agnostics
English agnostics